The 2016 Texas Rangers season was the Rangers' 56th season of the franchise and the 45th since the team relocated to Arlington, Texas. The Rangers won the American League (AL) West championship for the second straight season, with the best record in the AL. However, for the second straight year, they lost to the Toronto Blue Jays in the Division Series, this time in three games.  The Rangers set an MLB record by going 36–11 in one-run games.  Because of this stat as well as the team winning 95 games instead of their projected 80 wins, baseball pundits viewed the Rangers as a "lucky" team.

Regular season

Season standings

American League West

American League Division Leaders and Wild Card

Record against opponents

Game log

|- style="background:#cfc"
| 1 || April 4 || Mariners || 3–2 || Hamels (1–0) || Hernández (0–1) || Tolleson (1) || 49,289 || 1–0 ||W1
|- style="background:#fbb"
| 2 || April 5 || Mariners || 2–10 || Vincent (1–0) || Barnette (0–1) ||— || 28,386 || 1–1||L1
|- style="background:#fbb"
| 3 || April 6 || Mariners ||  5–9 || Benoit (1–0) || Tolleson (0–1) || —|| 26,945 || 1–2||L2
|- style="background:#fbb"
| 4 || April 7 || @ Angels || 3–4 || Street (1–0) || Dyson (0–1) ||— || 39,089 || 1–3||L3
|- style="background:#cfc"
| 5 || April 8 || @ Angels || 7–3 || Griffin (1–0) || Shoemaker (0–1) ||— || 35,207 || 2–3||W1
|- style="background:#cfc"
| 6 || April 9 || @ Angels || 4–1 || Hamels (2–0) || Richards (0–2) || Tolleson (2) || 38,106 || 3–3||W2
|- style="background:#fbb"
| 7 || April 10 || @ Angels || 1–3 || J. Weaver (1–0) || M. Pérez (0–1) || H. Street (1) || 35,097 || 3–4||L1
|- style="background:#cfc"
| 8 || April 11 || @ Mariners || 7–3 || C. Lewis (1–0) || H. Iwakuma (0–1) || —|| 13,468 || 4–4||W1
|- style="background:#cfc"
| 9 || April 12 || @ Mariners || 8–0 || D. Holland (1–0) || W. Miley (0–1) ||— || 13,376 || 5–4||W2
|- style="background:#fbb"
| 10 || April 13 || @ Mariners || 2–4 (10) || S. Cishek (1–0) || J. Diekman (0–1) || —|| 15,075 || 5–5||L1
|- style="background:#cfc"
| 11 || April 14 || Orioles || 6–3 || T. Wilhelmsen (1-0) || C. Tillman (1-1) || S. Tolleson (3) || 22,820 || 6–5||W1
|- style="background:#fbb"
| 12 || April 15 || Orioles || 5–11 || V. Worley (1-0) || T. Wilhelmsen (1-1) ||— || 32,628 || 6–6||L1
|- style="background:#cfc"
| 13 || April 16 || Orioles || 8–4 || K. Kela (1-0) || T. J. McFarland (0-1) ||— || 39,493 || 7–6||W1
|- style="text-align:center; style="background-color:#bbb;"
| –  || April 17 || Orioles ||colspan="9" | Postponed (rain). Makeup date: June 20th.
|- style="background:#cfc"
| 14 || April 19 || Astros || 7–5 || D. Holland (2-0) || S. Feldman (0-2) || S. Tolleson (4) || 24,181 || 8–6||W2
|- style="background:#cfc"
| 15 || April 20 || Astros || 2–1 || C. Hamels (3-0) || D. Fister (1-2) || S. Tolleson (5) || 25,821 || 9–6||W3
|- style="background:#cfc"
| 16 || April 21 || Astros || 7–4 || A.J. Griffin (2-0) || D. Keuchel (2-2) || S. Tolleson (6) || 25,886 || 10–6||W4
|- style="background:#fbb"
| 17 || April 22 || @ White Sox ||  0–5 || J. Quintana (2-1)  || M. Pérez (0-2) ||— || 15,486 || 10–7||L1
|- style="background:#fbb"
| 18 || April 23 || @ White Sox || 3–4 (11) || M. Albers (1-0) || N. Martinez (0-1) ||— || 20,182 || 10–8||L2
|- style="background:#fbb"
| 19 || April 24 || @ White Sox || 1–4 || M. Latos (4-0) ||D. Holland (2-1) || D. Robertson (7) || 26,058 || 10–9||L3
|- style="background:#fbb"
| 20 || April 25 || Yankees || 1–3 || N. Eovaldi (1-2) ||C. Ramos (0-1) || A. Miller (5) ||31,453 || 10–10||L4
|- style="background:#cfc"
| 21 || April 26 || Yankees || 10-1 || A.J. Griffin (3-0) || L. Severino (0-3) || —|| 26,163 || 11–10||W1
|- style="background:#cfc"
| 22 || April 27 || Yankees || 3–2 || M. Pérez (1-2) || CC Sabathia (1-2) || S. Tolleson (7) || 35,477 || 12–10||W2
|- style="background:#cfc"
| 23 || April 29 || Angels || 4–2 || C. Lewis (2-0) || H. Santiago (2-1) || S. Tolleson (8) || 29,589 || 13–10||W3
|- style="background:#cfc"
| 24 || April 30 || Angels || 7–2 || D. Holland (3-1) || M. Shoemaker (1-4) || — || 41,571 || 14–10||W4
|-

|- style="text-align:center; style="background-color:#ffbbbb;"
| 25 || May 1 || Angels || 6–9 || G. Mahle (1-0) || T. Wilhelmsen (1-2) || —|| 39,401 || 14–11||L1
|- style="text-align:center; style="background-color:#bbffbb;"
| 26 || May 2 || @ Blue Jays || 2–1 || T. Barnette (1-1) || G. Floyd (0-2) || S. Tolleson (9) || 25,323 || 15–11||W1
|- style="text-align:center; style="background-color:#ffbbbb;"
| 27 || May 3 || @ Blue Jays || 1–3 (10) || J. Biagini (1-1) || P. Klein (0-1) ||— || 24,437 || 15–12||L1
|- style="text-align:center; style="background-color:#ffbbbb;"
| 28 || May 4 || @ Blue Jays || 3–4 || R. Osuna (1-0) || T. Barnette (1-2) || —|| 25,229 || 15–13||L2
|- style="text-align:center; style="background-color:#ffbbbb;"
| 29 || May 5 || @ Blue Jays || 2–12 || J. A. Happ (4-0) || D. Holland (3-2) || —|| 35,468 || 15–14||L3
|- style="text-align:center; style="background-color:#bbffbb;"
| 30 || May 6 || @ Tigers || 5–1 || C. Hamels (4-0) || J. Zimmermann (5-1) ||— || 28,522 || 16–14||W1
|- style="text-align:center; style="background-color:#bbffbb;"
| 31 || May 7 || @ Tigers || 10–5 || A. Ranaudo (1-0) || K. Ryan (0-1) || S. Tolleson (10) || 35,551 || 17–14||W2
|- style="text-align:center; style="background-color:#bbffbb;"
| 32 || May 8 || @ Tigers ||  8–3 ||T. Wilhelmsen (2-2) || M. Lowe (1-1) || —|| 35,406 || 18–14||W3
|- style="text-align:center; style="background-color:#ffbbbb;"
| 33 || May 9 || White Sox || 4–8 (12) || D. Jennings (1-0) || C. Ramos (0-2) || —|| 22,958 || 18–15||L1
|- style="text-align:center; style="background-color:#bbffbb;"
| 34 || May 10 || White Sox || 13–11 || A. Claudio (1-0) || M. Albers (1-1) || S. Tolleson (11) || 25,804 || 19–15||W1
|- style="text-align:center; style="background-color:#bbffbb;"
| 35 || May 11 || White Sox || 6–5 || T. Barnette (2-2) || D. Jennings (1-1) || S. Dyson (1) || 29,023 || 20–15||W2
|- style="text-align:center; style="background-color:#ffbbbb;"
| 36 || May 13 || Blue Jays ||  0–5 || R. A. Dickey (2-4) || M. Pérez (1-3) || —|| 40,344 || 20–16||L1
|- style="text-align:center; style="background-color:#bbffbb;"
| 37 || May 14 || Blue Jays ||  6–5 (10) || T. Barnette (3-2) || G. Floyd (1-3) ||— || 47,115 || 21–16||W1
|- style="text-align:center; style="background-color:#bbffbb;"
| 38 || May 15 || Blue Jays ||  7-6 || M. Bush (1-0) || J. Chavez (0-1) || S. Dyson (2) || 41,327 || 22–16||W2
|- style="text-align:center; style="background-color:#ffbbbb;"
| 39 || May 16 || @ Athletics ||  1–3 || S. Manaea (1-1) || D. Holland (3-3) || R. Madson (11) || 10,068 || 22–17||L1
|- style="text-align:center; style="background-color:#ffbbbb;"
| 40 || May 17 || @ Athletics ||  5–8 || R. Madson (2-0) || S. Tolleson (0-2) ||— || 12,718 || 22–18||L2
|- style="text-align:center; style="background-color:#ffbbbb;"
| 41 || May 18 || @ Athletics ||  1–8 || R. Hill (6-3) || M. Pérez (1-4) ||— || 14,323 || 22–19||L3
|- style="text-align:center; style="background-color:#bbffbb;"
| 42 || May 20 || @ Astros ||  2–1 || C. Lewis (3-0) || L. McCullers (0-1) || S. Dyson (3) || 28,724 || 23–19||W1
|- style="text-align:center; style="background-color:#bbffbb;"
| 43 || May 21 || @ Astros ||  2–1 || C. Ramos (1-2) || M. Fiers (3-2) || S. Dyson (4) || 25,886 || 24–19||W2
|- style="text-align:center; style="background-color:#bbffbb;"
| 44 || May 22 || @ Astros ||  9–2 || C. Hamels (5-0) || D. Keuchel (2-6) || —|| 35,035 || 25–19||W3
|- style="text-align:center; style="background-color:#ffbbbb;"
| 45 || May 23 || Angels || 0–2 || N. Tropeano (3-2) || D. Holland (3-4) || J. Smith (6) || 25,298 || 25–20||L1
|- style="text-align:center; style="background-color:#bbffbb;"
| 46 || May 24 || Angels ||  4–1 ||  M. Pérez (2-4) || J. Chacín (1-3) || S. Dyson (5) || 26,125 || 26–20||W1
|- style="text-align:center; style="background-color:#bbffbb;"
| 47 || May 25 || Angels ||  15–9 || C. Lewis (4-0) || H. Santiago (3-3) || —|| 32,480 || 27–20||W2
|- style="text-align:center; style="background-color:#ffbbbb;"
| 48 || May 27 || Pirates || 1–9 || J. Niese (5-2) || C. Hamels (5-1) || —|| 37,645 || 27–21||L1
|- style="text-align:center; style="background-color:#bbffbb;"
| 49 || May 28 || Pirates ||  5–2 || Y. Darvish (1-0) || J. Nicasio (4-4) ||— || 46,950 || 28–21||W1
|- style="text-align:center; style="background-color:#bbffbb;"
| 50 || May 29 || Pirates ||  6–2 || M. Pérez (3-4) || F. Liriano (4-4) ||— || 44,613 || 29–21||W2
|- style="text-align:center; style="background-color:#bbffbb;"
| 51 || May 30 || @ Indians ||  9–2 || D. Holland (4-4) || J. Tomlin (7-1) || C. Ramos (1) || 14,514 || 30–21||W3
|- style="text-align:center; style="background-color:#bbffbb;"
| 52 || May 31 || @ Indians || 7–3 || C. Lewis (5-0) || C. Kluber (4-6) || S. Dyson (6) || 10,428 || 31–21||W4
|-

|- style="text-align:center; style="background-color:#ffbbbb;"
| 53 || June 1 || @ Indians ||  4–5 (11) || T. Gorzelanny (1-0) || A. Claudio (1-1) ||— || 10,524 || 31–22||L1
|- style="text-align:center; style="background-color:#bbffbb;"
| 54 || June 3 || Mariners ||  7–3 || Y. Darvish (2-0) || T. Walker (2-6) ||— || 32,395 || 32–22||W1
|- style="text-align:center; style="background-color:#bbffbb;"
| 55 || June 4 || Mariners ||  10–4 || M. Pérez (4-4) || N. Karns (5-2) ||—|| 34,317 || 33–22||W2
|- style="text-align:center; style="background-color:#bbffbb;"
| 56 || June 5 || Mariners ||  3–2 || D. Holland (5-4) || H. Iwakuma (4-5) || S. Dyson (7) || 37,616 || 34–22||W3
|- style="text-align:center; style="background-color:#bbffbb;"
| 57 || June 6 || Astros ||  6–5 || S. Dyson (1-1) || K. Giles (0-3) ||— || 30,021 || 35–22||W4
|- style="text-align:center; style="background-color:#bbffbb;"
| 58 || June 7 || Astros || 4–3 || J. Diekman (1-1) || D. Keuchel (3-8) || S. Dyson (8) || 32,189 || 36–22||W5
|- style="text-align:center; style="background-color:#ffbbbb;"
| 59 || June 8 || Astros || 1–3 || D. Fister (6-3) || T. Wilhelmsen (2-3) || W. Harris (2) || 37,696 || 36–23||L1
|- style="text-align:center; style="background-color:#bbffbb;"
| 60 || June 9 || Astros || 5–3 || M. Pérez (5-4) || C. McHugh (5-5) || J. Diekman (1) || 30,145 || 37–23||W1
|- style="text-align:center; style="background-color:#ffbbbb;"
| 61 || June 10 || @ Mariners ||  5–7 || H. Iwakuma (5-5) || D. Holland (5-5) || S. Cishek (14) || 37,055 || 37–24||L1
|- style="text-align:center; style="background-color:#bbffbb;"
| 62 || June 11 || @ Mariners || 2–1 (11) || M. Bush (2-0) || M. Montgomery (2-1) || S. Dyson (9) || 36,055 || 38–24||W1
|- style="text-align:center; style="background-color:#bbffbb;"
| 63 || June 12 || @ Mariners ||  6–4 || C. Hamels (6-1) || W. Miley (6-3) || S. Dyson (10) || 39,251 || 39–24||W2
|- style="text-align:center; style="background-color:#ffbbbb;"
| 64 || June 13 || @ Athletics ||  5–14 || D. Coulombe (1-0) || C. Ramos (1-3) || Z. Neal (1) || 13,453 || 39–25||L1
|- style="text-align:center; style="background-color:#bbffbb;"
| 65 || June 14 || @ Athletics ||  10–6 || M. Pérez (6-4) || E. Surkamp (0-4) ||— || 13,101 || 40–25||W1
|- style="text-align:center; style="background-color:#bbffbb;"
| 66 || June 15 || @ Athletics ||  7–5 || N. Martinez (1-1) || J. Axford (3-2) || S. Dyson (11) || 10,115 || 41–25||W2
|- style="text-align:center; style="background-color:#bbffbb;"
| 67 || June 16 || @ Athletics ||  5–1 || C. Lewis (6-0) || D. Mengden (0-2) ||— || 14,236 || 42–25||W3
|- style="text-align:center; style="background-color:#bbffbb;"
| 68 || June 17 || @ Cardinals ||  1–0 || C. Hamels (7-1) || M. Wacha (2-7) || S. Dyson (12) || 44,064 || 43–25||W4
|- style="text-align:center; style="background-color:#bbffbb;"
| 69 || June 18 || @ Cardinals ||  4–3 || S. Tolleson (1-2) || T. Rosenthal (2-2) || J. Diekman (2) || 44,375 || 44–25||W5
|- style="text-align:center; style="background-color:#bbffbb;"
| 70 || June 19 || @ Cardinals || 5–4 || T. Barnette (4-2) || M. Bowman (1-2) || S. Dyson (13) || 44,897 || 45–25||W6
|- style="text-align:center; style="background-color:#bbffbb;"
| 71 || June 20 || Orioles ||  4–3 || S. Tolleson (2-2) || K. Gausman (0-5) || S. Dyson (14) || 35,366 || 46–25||W7
|- style="text-align:center; style="background-color:#ffbbbb;"
| 72 || June 21 || Reds ||  2–8 || A. DeSclafani (1-0) || C. Lewis (6-1) || —|| 32,291 || 46–26||L1
|- style="text-align:center; style="background-color:#bbffbb;"
| 73 || June 22 || Reds || 6–4 || C. Hamels (8-1) || D. Straily (4-4) || S. Dyson (15) || 32,407 || 47–26||W1
|- style="text-align:center; style="background-color:#ffbbbb;"
| 74 || June 24 || Red Sox ||  7–8 || H. Hembree (4-0) || M. Bush (2-1) || K. Uehara (2) || 46,811 || 47–27||L1
|- style="text-align:center; style="background-color:#bbffbb;"
| 75 || June 25 || Red Sox || 10–3 || C. Ramos (2-3) || S. Wright (8-5) ||— || 47,559 || 48–27||W1
|- style="text-align:center; style="background-color:#bbffbb;"
| 76 || June 26 || Red Sox ||  6–2 || M. Pérez (7-4) || C. Buchholz (3-8) ||— || 36,312 || 49–27||W2
|- style="text-align:center; style="background-color:#bbffbb;"
| 77 || June 27 || @ Yankees ||  9–6 || T. Barnette (5-2) || K. Yates (2-1) || S. Dyson (16) || 32,914 || 50–27||W3
|- style="text-align:center; style="background-color:#bbffbb;"
| 78 || June 28 || @ Yankees ||  7–1 || C. Hamels (9-1) || CC Sabathia (5-5) ||— || 32,373 || 51–27||W4
|- style="text-align:center; style="background-color:#ffbbbb;"
| 79 || June 29 || @ Yankees ||  7–9 || L. Cessa (1-0) || S. Dyson (1-2) ||— || 39,875 || 51–28||L1
|- style="text-align:center; style="background-color:#ffbbbb;"
| 80 || June 30 || @ Yankees ||  1–2 || A. Chapman (2-0) || T. Barnette (5-3) ||— || 39,934 || 51–29||L2
|-

|- style="text-align:center; style="background-color:#bbffbb;"
| 81 || July 1 || @ Twins ||  3–2 (10) || M. Bush (3–1) || F. Abad (1–3) || S. Dyson (17) || 25,530 || 52–29||W1
|- style="text-align:center; style="background-color:#ffbbbb;"
| 82 || July 2 || @ Twins ||  5–17 || T. Duffey (4–6) || C. Gonzalez (0–1) ||— || 21,466 || 52–30||L1
|- style="text-align:center; style="background-color:#ffbbbb;"
| 83 || July 3 || @ Twins ||  4–5 || K. Gibson (2–5) || C. Hamels (9–2) || B. Kintzler (4) || 26,942 || 52–31||L2
|- style="text-align:center; style="background-color:#ffbbbb;"
| 84 || July 4 || @ Red Sox ||  5–12 || R. Porcello (10–2) || N. Martinez (1–2) ||— || 36,253 || 52–32||L3
|- style="text-align:center; style="background-color:#bbffbb;"
| 85 || July 5 || @ Red Sox ||  7–2 || C. Ramos (3–3) || D. Price (8–6) ||— || 35,964 || 53–32||W1
|- style="text-align:center; style="background-color:#ffbbbb;"
| 86 || July 6 || @ Red Sox ||  6–11 || S. Wright (10–5) || M. Pérez (7–5) ||— || 37,175 || 53–33||L1
|- style="text-align:center; style="background-color:#ffbbbb;"
| 87 || July 7 || Twins ||  1–10 || T. Duffey (5–6) || C. Gonzalez (0–2) ||— || 43,934 || 53–34||L2
|- style="text-align:center; style="background-color:#bbffbb;"
| 88 || July 8 || Twins ||  6–5 || T. Barnette (6–3) || R. Pressly (2–5) || S. Dyson (18)|| 40,330 || 54–34||W1
|- style="text-align:center; style="background-color:#ffbbbb;"
| 89 || July 9 || Twins ||  6–8 || R. Nolasco (4–7) || K. Lohse (0–1) || B. Kintzler (5) || 37,708 || 54–35||L1
|- style="text-align:center; style="background-color:#ffbbbb;"
| 90 || July 10 || Twins ||  5–15 || T. Milone (2–2) || A.J. Griffin (3–1) ||— || 31,978 || 54–36||L2
|- style="text-align:center; background:#bbcaff;"
| colspan="10" | 87th All-Star Game in San Diego, California
|- style="text-align:center; style="background-color:#ffbbbb;"
| 91 || July 15 || @ Cubs ||  0–6 || K. Hendricks (8–6) || M. Pérez (7–6) ||— || 41,482 || 54–37||L3
|- style="text-align:center; style="background-color:#ffbbbb;"
| 92 || July 16 || @ Cubs ||  1–3 || J. Hammel (8-5) || Y. Darvish (2–1) || H. Rondon (15) || 41,346 || 54–38||L4
|- style="text-align:center; style="background-color:#bbffbb;"
| 93 || July 17 || @ Cubs ||  4–1 || C. Hamels (10–2) || J. Lackey (7–6) || S. Dyson (19) || 41,213 || 55–38||W1
|- style="text-align:center; style="background-color:#ffbbbb;"
| 94 || July 18 || @ Angels ||  5-9 || J. C. Ramirez (2–3) || K. Kela (1–1) || —|| 36,020 || 55–39||L1
|- style="text-align:center; style="background-color:#ffbbbb;"
| 95 || July 19 || @ Angels ||  6–8 || T. Lincecum (2–3) || K. Lohse (0–2) || H. Street (8) || 36,368 || 55–40||L2
|- style="text-align:center; style="background-color:#ffbbbb;"
| 96 || July 20 || @ Angels || 4–7 || H. Santiago (8–4) || M. Pérez (7–7) || —|| 37,095 || 55–41||L3
|- style="text-align:center; style="background-color:#ffbbbb;"
| 97 || July 22 || @ Royals || 1–3 || D. Duffy (6–1) || Y. Darvish (2–2) || W. Davis (21) || 33,535 || 55–42 || L4
|- style="text-align:center; style="background-color:#bbffbb;"
| 98 || July 23 || @ Royals || 7–4 || C. Hamels (11–2) || Y. Ventura (6–8) || —|| 32,132 || 56–42 || W1
|- style="text-align:center; style="background-color:#bbffbb;"
| 99 || July 24 || @ Royals || 2–1 || A. Claudio (2–1) || L. Hochevar (2–3) || S. Dyson (20) || 32,739 || 57–42 || W2
|- style="text-align:center; style="background-color:#bbffbb;"
| 100 || July 25 || Athletics || 7–6 || J. Diekman (2–1) || R. Madson (3–4) ||— || 27,292 || 58–42 || W3
|- style="text-align:center; style="background-color:#ffbbbb;"
| 101 || July 26 || Athletics ||3–6|| S. Gray (5–9) || N. Martinez (1–3) || —|| 25,272 || 58–43 ||L1
|- style="text-align:center; style="background-color:#ffbbbb;"
| 102 || July 27 || Athletics ||4–6|| R. Dull (5–2) || M. Bush (3–2) || R. Madson (22) || 29,630 || 58–44 ||L2
|- style="text-align:center; style="background-color:#bbffbb;"
| 103 || July 28 || Royals ||3–2|| C. Hamels (12–2) || Y. Ventura (6–9) || S. Dyson (21) || 36,008 || 59–44 || W1
|- style="text-align:center; style="background-color:#bbffbb;"
| 104 || July 29 || Royals ||8–3|| A.J. Griffin (4–1) || E. Volquez (8–9) ||— || 40,008 || 60–44 || W2
|- style="text-align:center; style="background-color:#bbffbb;"
| 105 || July 30 || Royals ||2–1|| M. Bush (4–2) || B. Pounders (1–1) ||— || 47,125 || 61–44 || W3
|- style="text-align:center; style="background-color:#bbffbb;"
| 106 || July 31 || Royals ||5–3|| L. Harrell (3–2) || D. Gee (3–5) || S. Dyson (22) || 32,806 || 62–44 || W4
|-

|- style="text-align:center; style="background-color:#ffbbbb;"
| 107 || August 2 || @ Orioles ||1–5|| D. Bundy (4–3) || Y. Darvish (2–3) || D. O'Day (3) || 22,230 || 62–45 || L1
|- style="text-align:center; style="background-color:#ffbbbb;"
| 108 || August 3 || @ Orioles ||2–3|| K. Gausman (3–8) || C. Hamels (12–3) || Z. Britton (33) || 24,552 || 62–46 || L2
|- style="text-align:center; style="background-color:#bbffbb;"
| 109 || August 4 || @ Orioles ||5–3|| A.J. Griffin (5–1) || W. Miley (7–9) || S. Dyson (23) || 28,762 || 63–46 || W1
|- style="text-align:center; style="background-color:#ffbbbb;"
| 110 || August 5 || @ Astros ||0–5|| D. Keuchel (7–11) || M. Pérez (7–8) ||— || 32,820 || 63–47 ||L1
|- style="text-align:center; style="background-color:#bbffbb;"
| 111 || August 6 || @ Astros ||3–2|| K. Kela (2–1) || C. Devenski (0–3) || S. Dyson (24) || 42,272 || 64–47 || W1
|- style="text-align:center; style="background-color:#bbffbb;"
| 112 || August 7 || @ Astros ||5–3 (11)|| M. Bush (5–2) || C. Devenski (0–4) ||— || 33,909 || 65–47 || W2
|- style="text-align:center; style="background-color:#bbffbb;"
| 113 || August 8 || @ Rockies ||4–3|| K. Kela (3–1) || C. Estevez (2–7) || J. Diekman (3) || 31,768 || 66–47 || W3
|- style="text-align:center; style="background-color:#bbffbb;"
| 114 || August 9 || @ Rockies ||7–5|| A. Claudio (3–1) || S. Oberg (0–1) || S. Dyson (25) || 27,671 || 67–47 || W4
|- style="text-align:center; style="background-color:#bbffbb;"
| 115 || August 10 || Rockies ||5–4|| J. Diekman (3–1) || B. Logan (1–2) || M. Bush (1) || 29,866 || 68–47 || W5
|- style="text-align:center; style="background-color:#ffbbbb;"
| 116 || August 11 || Rockies ||9–12|| S. Oberg (1–1) || J. Diekman (3–2) || A. Ottavino (1) || 20,720|| 68–48 || L1
|- style="text-align:center; style="background-color:#bbffbb;"
| 117 || August 12 || Tigers ||8–5|| Y. Darvish (3–3) || A. Sanchez (6–12) || S. Dyson (26) || 31,190 || 69–48 || W1
|- style="text-align:center; style="background-color:#ffbbbb;"
| 118 || August 13 || Tigers || 0–2 || M. Boyd (4–2) || C. Hamels (12–4) || F. Rodríguez (33) || 37,792 || 69–49 || L1
|- style="text-align:center; style="background-color:#ffbbbb;"
| 119 || August 14 || Tigers || 0–7 || M. Fulmer (10–3) || A.J. Griffin (5–2) || —|| 35,458 || 69–50 || L2
|- style="text-align:center; style="background-color:#bbffbb;"
| 120 || August 15 || Athletics ||5–2|| M. Pérez (8–8)  || R. Detwiler (1–1) || S. Dyson (27) || 22,845 || 70–50 || W1
|- style="text-align:center; style="background-color:#bbffbb;"
| 121 || August 16 || Athletics ||5–4 (10)|| K. Kela (4–1) || J. Axford (4–4) ||— || 21,877 ||71–50|| W2
|- style="text-align:center; style="background-color:#bbffbb;"
| 122 || August 17 || Athletics ||6–2|| Y. Darvish (4–3) || S. Manaea (4–8) ||— || 26,743 ||72–50|| W3
|- style="text-align:center; style="background-color:#bbffbb;"
| 123 || August 19 || @ Rays ||6–2|| C. Hamels (13–4) || M. Andriese (6–5) || —|| 15,109 ||73–50|| W4
|- style="text-align:center; style="background-color:#ffbbbb;"
| 124 || August 20 || @ Rays ||2–8|| J. Odorizzi (8–5) || A.J. Griffin (5–3) ||— || 16,505 ||73–51|| L1
|- style="text-align:center; style="background-color:#ffbbbb;"
| 125 || August 21 || @ Rays ||4–8|| D. Smyly (6–11) || M. Pérez (8–9) || —|| 17,685 ||73–52|| L2
|- style="text-align:center; style="background-color:#ffbbbb;"
| 126 || August 23 || @ Reds ||0–3|| D. Straily (10–6) || D. Holland (5–6) || T. Cingrani (16) || 16,668 || 73–53 || L3
|- style="text-align:center; style="background-color:#bbffbb;"
| 127 || August 24 || @ Reds ||6–5|| J. Diekman (4–2) || B. Wood (5–2) || S. Dyson (28) || 16,100 || 74–53 || W1
|- style="text-align:center; style="background-color:#bbffbb;"
| 128 || August 25 || Indians ||9–0|| C. Hamels (14–4) || J. Tomlin (11–8) ||— || 23,768 || 75–53 || W2
|- style="text-align:center; style="background-color:#ffbbbb;"
| 129 || August 26 || Indians ||1–12|| C. Kluber (14–8) || M. Pérez (8–10) ||— || 31,853 || 75–54 || L1
|- style="text-align:center; style="background-color:#bbffbb;"
| 130 || August 27 || Indians ||7–0|| A.J. Griffin (6–3) || C. Carrasco (9–7) ||— || 44,944 || 76–54 || W1
|- style="text-align:center; style="background-color:#bbffbb;"
| 131 || August 28 || Indians ||2–1|| D. Holland (6–6) || D. Salazar (11–6) || S. Dyson (29) || 35,225 || 77–54 || W2
|- style="text-align:center; style="background-color:#bbffbb;"
| 132 || August 29 || Mariners ||6–3|| Y. Darvish (5–3) || H. Iwakuma (14–10) || S. Dyson (30) || 22,972 || 78–54 || W3
|- style="text-align:center; style="background-color:#bbffbb;"
| 133 || August 30 || Mariners ||8–7|| M. Bush (6–2) || E. Díaz (0–3) ||— || 26,950 || 79–54 || W4
|- style="text-align:center; style="background-color:#bbffbb;"
| 134 || August 31 || Mariners ||14–1|| M. Pérez (9–10) || F. Hernandez (9–5) ||— || 21,309 || 80–54 || W5
|-

|- style="text-align:center; style="background-color:#bbffbb;"
| 135 || September 2 || Astros ||10–8|| A.J. Griffin (7–3) || D. Fister (12–10) || S. Dyson (31) || 35,102 || 81–54 || W6
|- style="text-align:center; style="background-color:#bbffbb;"
| 136 || September 3 || Astros ||12–4|| D. Holland (7–6) || J. Musgrove (2–3) ||— || 35,538 || 82–54 || W7
|- style="text-align:center; style="background-color:#ffbbbb;"
| 137 || September 4 || Astros ||6–7|| C. Devenski (3–4) || Y. Darvish (5–4) || K. Giles (8) || 46,025 || 82–55 || L1
|- style="text-align:center; style="background-color:#ffbbbb;"
| 138 || September 5 || @ Mariners ||6–14|| F. Hernández (10–5) || C. Hamels (14–5) || — || 23,618 || 82–56 || L2
|- style="text-align:center; style="background-color:#bbffbb;"
| 139 || September 6 || @ Mariners ||10–7|| M. Pérez (10–10) || J. Paxton (4–6) || S. Dyson (32) || 14,615 || 83–56 || W1
|- style="text-align:center; style="background-color:#ffbbbb;"
| 140 || September 7 || @ Mariners ||3–8|| A. Miranda (3–1) || A.J. Griffin (7–4) ||— || 15,434 || 83–57 || L1
|- style="text-align:center; style="background-color:#ffbbbb;"
| 141 || September 8 || @ Mariners ||3–6|| T. Walker (5–10) || D. Holland (7–7) || E. Díaz (13) || 17,493 || 83–58 || L2
|- style="text-align:center; style="background-color:#bbffbb;"
| 142 || September 9 || @ Angels ||2–1|| M. Bush (7–2) || J. Ramirez (1–1) || S. Dyson (33) || 42,137 || 84–58 || W1
|- style="text-align:center; style="background-color:#bbffbb;"
| 143 || September 10 || @ Angels ||8–5|| T. Scheppers (1–0) || J. Valdez (1–2) || S. Dyson (34) || 39,146 || 85–58 || W2
|- style="text-align:center; style="background-color:#ffbbbb;"
| 144 || September 11 || @ Angels ||2–3|| J. Weaver (11–11) || C. Lewis (6–2) || Bailey (3) || 35,052 || 85–59 || L1
|- style="text-align:center; style="background-color:#bbffbb;"
| 145 || September 12 || @ Astros || 4–3 (12) || K. Kela (5–1) || J. Hoyt (1–1) || J. Diekman (4) || 22,147 || 86–59 || W1
|- style="text-align:center; style="background-color:#bbffbb;"
| 146 || September 13 || @ Astros ||3–2|| A. Claudio (4–1) || K. Giles (2–4) || T. Scheppers (1) || 22,133 || 87–59 || W2
|- style="text-align:center; style="background-color:#ffbbbb;"
| 147 || September 14 || @ Astros ||4–8|| J. Musgrove (3–4) || D. Holland (7–8) ||— || 25,041 || 87–60 || L1
|- style="text-align:center; style="background-color:#bbffbb;"
| 148 || September 16 || Athletics ||7–6|| S. Dyson (2–2) || R. Madson (5–6) || —|| 30,486 || 88–60 || W1
|- style="text-align:center; style="background-color:#ffbbbb;"
| 149 || September 17 || Athletics ||2–11|| R. Alcántara (1–1) || Y. Darvish (5–5) ||— || 39,691 || 88–61 || L1
|- style="text-align:center; style="background-color:#ffbbbb;"
| 150 || September 18 || Athletics ||2–5|| R. Detwiler (2–3) || C. Lewis (6–3) || R. Dull (3) || 34,224 || 88–62 || L2
|- style="text-align:center; style="background-color:#bbffbb;"
| 151 || September 19 || Angels ||3–2|| S. Dyson (3–2) || J. Álvarez (1–3) || —|| 29,068 || 89–62 || W1
|- style="text-align:center; style="background-color:#bbffbb;"
| 152 || September 20 || Angels ||5–4|| N. Martinez (2–3) || D. Wright (0–4) || S. Dyson (35) || 26,520 || 90–62 || W2
|- style="text-align:center; style="background-color:#ffbbbb;"
| 153 || September 21 || Angels ||4–5|| J. Weaver (12-12)|| D. Holland (7-9) || A. Bailey (4) || 35,609 || 90–63 || L1
|- style="text-align:center; style="background-color:#bbffbb;"
| 154 || September 23 || @ Athletics ||3–0|| C. Hamels (15-5) || K. Graveman (10-11) || S. Dyson (36) || 26,367 || 91–63 || W1
|- style="text-align:center; style="background-color:#bbffbb;"
| 155 || September 24 || @ Athletics ||5–0|| Y. Darvish (6-5) || R. Alcántara (1-2) || —|| 16,736 || 92–63 || W2
|- style="text-align:center; style="background-color:#ffbbbb;"
| 156 || September 25 || @ Athletics ||1–7|| J. Cotton (2–0) || C. Lewis (6–4) ||— || 17,048 || 92–64 || L1
|- style="text-align:center; style="background-color:#ffbbbb;"
| 157 || September 26 || Brewers ||3–8|| M. Garza (6–8) || M. Perez (10–11) || —|| 27,263 || 92–65 || L2
|- style="text-align:center; style="background-color:#bbffbb;"
| 158 || September 27 || Brewers ||6–4|| T. Barnette (7–3) || J. Nelson (8–16) || S. Dyson (37) || 29,668 || 93–65 || W1
|- style="text-align:center; style="background-color:#bbffbb;"
| 159 || September 28 || Brewers ||8–5|| J. Jeffress (1–0) || C. Knebel (1–4) ||— || 36,619 || 94–65 || W2
|- style="text-align:center; style="background-color:#bbffbb;"
| 160 || September 30 || Rays ||3–1|| Y. Darvish (7–5) || M. Andriese (8–8) || S. Dyson (38) || 35,968 || 95–65 || W3
|-

|- style="text-align:center; style="background-color:#ffbbbb;"
| 161 || October 1 || Rays || 1–4 || J. Odorizzi (10–6) || C. Lewis (6–5) || A. Colomé (37) || 42,093 || 95–66 || L1
|- style="text-align:center; style="background-color:#ffbbbb;"
| 162 || October 2 || Rays || 4–6 (10) || A. Colomé (2–4) || T. Scheppers (1–1) ||— || 37,015 || 95–67 || L2
|-

Postseason

Game log

|- style="text-align:center; style="background-color:#ffbbbb;"
| 1 || October 6 || Blue Jays || 1–10 || Estrada (1–0) || Hamels (0–1) || — || 47,434 || 0–1 
|- style="text-align:center; style="background-color:#ffbbbb;"
| 2 || October 7 || Blue Jays || 3–5 || Happ (1-0) || Darvish (0–1) || Osuna (1) || 48,019 || 0–2 
|- style="text-align:center; style="background-color:#ffbbbb;"
| 3 || October 9 || @ Blue Jays || 6–7 (10) || Osuna (1–0) || Bush (0–1) || —  || 49,555 || 0–3
|- style="text-align:center; style="background-color:#ffbbbb;"

Postseason rosters

| style="text-align:left" |
Pitchers: 11 Yu Darvish 23 Jeremy Jeffress 33 Martín Pérez 35 Cole Hamels 41 Jake Diekman 43 Tony Barnette 47 Sam Dyson 48 Colby Lewis 50 Keone Kela 51 Matt Bush 58 Alex Claudio 
Catchers: 25 Jonathan Lucroy 61 Robinson Chirinos 
Infielders: 1 Elvis Andrus 12 Rougned Odor 18 Mitch Moreland 19 Jurickson Profar 29 Adrián Beltré 
Outfielders: 14 Carlos Gómez 16 Ryan Rua 17 Shin-Soo Choo 20 Ian Desmond 30 Nomar Mazara 31 Jared Hoying  
Designated hitters: 36 Carlos Beltrán 
|- valign="top"

Roster

Farm system

LEAGUE CHAMPIONS: High Desert

Blue Jays–Rangers brawl
During the May 15, 2016, game against the Toronto Blue Jays, there were two benches-clearing incidents. Following a contentious meeting in the ALDS the previous season, many people thought the Rangers would target Jose Bautista for his controversial bat flip in the ALDS. However, the first six games of the season between the clubs were played without incident. Finally, in the last regular season game between the clubs, Rangers reliever Matt Bush hit Bautista in the ribs with a fastball. On the ensuing play, Bautista slid hard into Rangers second baseman Rougned Odor. Odor, taking exception, pushed Bautista, then proceeded to punch Bautista squarely in the face. This fight caused both benches and bullpens to clear. Bautista, Odor, Steve Buechele, and Josh Donaldson were ejected after the brawl. Later in the game, Blue Jays pitcher Jesse Chavez hit Prince Fielder with a pitch causing the benches to clear again, although this time no punches were thrown. Chavez and DeMarlo Hale were ejected following this incident. Odor would serve a seven game suspension for his actions. Toronto manager John Gibbons and Chavez would serve three games suspensions while Bautista and Elvis Andrus served one game suspensions.

References

External links

2016 Texas Rangers Official Site 
2016 Texas Rangers at ESPN
2016 Texas Rangers season at Baseball Reference

Texas Rangers seasons
Texas Rangers
Rangers
American League West champion seasons